A swipe file is a collection of tested and proven advertising and sales letters. Keeping a swipe file is a common practice used by advertising copywriters and creative directors as a reference of ideas for projects.

Authors and publishers can benefit from creating a swipe file of best-selling titles to give them ideas for their own titles. Publicists can create a swipe file of great press release headlines. Copywriters also need to keep a swipe file ad copies for future inspiration.

Swipe files are also commonly used by Internet marketers who need to gather a lot of resources not only about products but also about marketing methods and strategies.

See also

Commonplace book
Communication design
Internet marketing
Morgue file
Search engine optimization

External links 

 Swipe folder
 Swipe file
 MorgueFile

References

Advertising